The 2000–01 Alabama Crimson Tide men's basketball team represented the University of Alabama in the 2000–01 NCAA Division I men's basketball season. The team was led by third-year head coach Mark Gottfried and played its home games at Coleman Coliseum in Tuscaloosa, Alabama as a member of the Southeastern Conference. They finished the season 25–11, 8–8 in SEC play, which placed them in fourth place in the SEC Western Division. They defeated Vanderbilt to advance to the quarterfinals of the SEC tournament where they lost to Florida. They received an invitation to the National Invitation Tournament where they advanced all the way to the championship game before they lost to Tulsa.

Schedule and results

|-
!colspan=12 style=|Exhibition

|-
!colspan=12 style=|Regular season

|-
!colspan=12 style=|  SEC tournament

|-
!colspan=12 style="background:#990000; color:#FFFFFF;"| National Invitation tournament

Sources

References 

Alabama Crimson Tide men's basketball seasons
Alabama Crimson Tide
Alabama
Alabama Crimson Tide
Alabama